Josef Spudich (November 9, 1908 – March 10, 2001) was a United States professional American football player and teacher.

He was born one of nine children of parents who came to the United States in 1903 from Croatia.
 
In order to help with family expenses, Spudich worked nights and summers in a coal mine while attending high school in Benld, Illinois, and was graduated in 1929. He was a graduate of McKendree College, Lebanon, Illinois, in 1933, where he was named to the United Press International All-Star Football Team in 1932, and was All State fullback in 1931 and 1932.  Moreover, he played professional football for the St. Louis Gunners, the Tulsa Oilers, and the Chicago Cardinals.

Spudich earned his master's degree from the University of Missouri and did post-graduate work at Oxford in England and at Columbia University.

He taught and coached in Sikeston, Missouri, Cairo and El Dorado Springs; then starting in 1942, at Freeport High School, Freeport, Illinois, where he was head football coach from 1951–1954.

Spudich taught English and served as assistant principal.  He was
a soft-spoken man and had the respect and admiration of his students. Mr. Spudich always had time to help students, even if it was at the expense of his own plans.  He was a very patient and kind man. He was also not only considered the High School's strongest man, his arms filling out his suit jackets, but was also considered the best dressed male teacher. Joe, as he was known to his students, would also plan field trips, such as taking them to Chicago to see such plays as Camelot, starring Richard Burton. He also assigned then contemporary books such as Patterns, by Rod Serling, as well as classics, such as Shakespeare's, Julius Caesar. After retiring at Freeport High School in 1964, he taught English and was chairman of the Humanities Division at Highland College, also in Freeport, Illinois.

Mr. Spudich served on the Freeport Library Board, was a Freeport City Alderman, coached the Frogs Girls Softball Team, played slow pitch softball in his 1970s, helped move a log cabin to the Stephenson County Historical Society grounds in Freeport, and did all the stonework on his own house plus a lot of stonework for others.  If Joe knew that his stonework for some people was unaffordable, he did it free of cost.

References

External links 
 McKendree Hall of Fame profile

1908 births
2001 deaths
20th-century American educators
American football running backs
Chicago Cardinals players
Schoolteachers from  Illinois
McKendree Bearcats athletic directors
McKendree Bearcats football players
People from Macoupin County, Illinois
University of Missouri alumni